Joseph-Pierre-Élisabeth Peytes de Montcabrié (also spelled Peites) (1771–1806) was a French soldier during the French Revolutionary Wars and superior officer in the Grande Armée during the Napoleonic Wars.

Born in 1771 in Toulouse, Pierre-Élisabeth Peytes de Montcabrié was the second son of the then ensign, later rear-admiral of the French Navy. While still very young, Pierre-Elisabeth was admitted at the École Militaire in Paris, subsequently serving in the French Revolutionary army during some of the campaigns of the Revolutionary Wars and gaining a promotion to superior officer. He then served in Napoleon's Grande Armée and was mortally wounded on 6 November 1806, at the battle of Lübeck, while serving as chief of staff of artillery in Marshal Jean-de-Dieu Soult's IV Corps. Pierre-Elisabeth Peytes de Montcabrié died on 8 November, as a result of the battle wound he had received two days before.

References

Sources
  Oettinger, Eduard Maria - "Biographie universelle, ou dictionnaire historique, contenant la nécrologie des hommes de tous les pays, des articles consacrés à l'histoire générale des peuples, aux batailles mémorables, aux grands événements politiques, etc." 
  Pigeard, Alain - „Dictionnaire des batailles de Napoléon”, Tallandier, Bibliothèque Napoléonienne, 2004, 

French military personnel of the French Revolutionary Wars
French commanders of the Napoleonic Wars
French military personnel killed in the Napoleonic Wars
1771 births
1806 deaths